Self representation may refer to:

Self-image
Self-portrait
Pro se legal representation in the United States
Litigant in person, self-representation in a court in the UK
Self-representation (politics), a movement to encourage people in minorities to represent their own interests
Self-representation (culture), the way we represent ourselves to others within a particular culture
 Digital self-determination